Gianni Cimini (born July 13, 1983) is a Canadian soccer coach, who currently serves as head coach of Toronto FC II in MLS Next Pro.

Playing career 
He played youth soccer with the Woodbridge Strikers and also played for the Team Ontario provincial team.

From 2002 to 2003, he attending Old Dominion University, playing for the men's soccer team. He scored his first goal on September 18, 2002 against the American Eagles.

In 2004, he played for Philadelphia University, where he earned Atlantic Soccer Conference (ASC) First Team All-Conference awards in 2004 and 2005.

At international level, he played for the Canadian U17 and U18 teams.

Coaching career 
From 2006 to 2012, he was the Technical Director for the Woodbridge Strikers youth soccer club, also serving as a Regional Assistant Coach with the Ontario Soccer Association in 2011.

In 2012, he joined the Toronto FC Academy, where he worked in various coaching positions between the U12 and U17 levels. In 2020, he was listed as an honourable mention on Major League Soccer's list of academy coaches ready to make the jump to the first team. During this time, he also served as Aurora FC's Elite Player Pathway Manager and the head coach of the women's team in League1 Ontario.

In 2022, he was named head coach of Toronto FC II in MLS Next Pro. In his first season as coach, he led the team to their first-ever playoff birth, after winning the Northeast Division. After defeating Philadelphia Union 2 in the Conference semi-finals, they were defeated by Columbus Crew 2 in extra time in the Conference finals.

Coaching statistics

References 

1983 births
Living people
Canadian soccer coaches
Toronto FC non-playing staff
Toronto FC II coaches
Old Dominion Monarchs men's soccer players
Woodbridge Strikers players
Philadelphia Rams soccer players